Ngân Sơn is a rural district of Bắc Kạn province in the Northeast region of Vietnam. As of 2003, the district had a population of 29,509 people. The district covers an area of 644.4 km². The district capital lies at Vân Tùng commune.

Administrative divisions
The district is subdivided to 11 commune level subdivisions, including the township of Nà Phặc, and the rural communes of: Hương Nê, Lãng Ngâm, Thuần Mang, Thượng Quan, Đức Vân, Vân Tùng (district capital), Trung Hòa, Cốc Đán, Thượng Ân and Bằng Vân.

References

Districts of Bắc Kạn province